

Torneo Apertura ("Opening" Tournament)

Top Scorers

Relegation

There is no relegation after the Apertura. For the relegation results of this tournament see below

Torneo Clausura ("Closing" Tournament)

Top Scorers

Relegation

"Promoción" Playoff

Talleres de Córdoba wins 2-0 and stays in Argentine First Division.
San Martín de Mendoza remains in Argentine Nacional B.

Nueva Chicago wins 3-0 and stays in Argentine First Division.
Argentinos Juniors remains in Argentine Nacional B.

Argentine clubs in international competitions

Lower Leagues

National team
This section covers Argentina's matches from August 1, 2002, to July 31, 2003.

Friendly matches

External links
AFA
Argentina 2002–2003 by Javier Romiser at RSSSF.

 

es:Torneo Clausura 2003 (Argentina)
ko:아르헨티나 프리메라 디비시온 2002-03
it:Primera División 2002-2003 (Argentina)
pl:I liga argentyńska w piłce nożnej (2002/2003)
zh:阿根廷足球甲级联赛2002–2003赛季